Emin Rafael oğlu Ağayev (born 10 August 1973) is an Azerbaijani professional football coach and a former player. He also holds Russian citizenship. He is an assistant coach with FC Khimki-M.

Club career
He made his debut in the Russian Premier League in 2001 for Torpedo-ZIL Moscow.

National team statistics

International goals

Honours

Club
Torpedo-ZIL Moscow
 Football Championship of the National League, Runner-up (1): 2000

Individual
 Azerbaijani Footballer of the Year: 2000
 Russian Second Division, Zone West best defender: 2009.

References

1973 births
Living people
Footballers from Baku
Soviet footballers
Azerbaijani footballers
Azerbaijani expatriate footballers
Azerbaijan international footballers
Association football defenders
FC Anzhi Makhachkala players
FC Moscow players
FC Khimki players
FC Baltika Kaliningrad players
Russian Premier League players
Expatriate footballers in Russia
Azerbaijani expatriate football managers
Expatriate football managers in Russia
Azerbaijani football managers
Neftçi PFK players
FC Dynamo Bryansk players
FC Nosta Novotroitsk players